The Tiburones de Aguadilla were a baseball team in Puerto Rico's Liga de Béisbol Profesional Roberto Clemente. They were based in Aguadilla.

The National Baseball Hall of Fame and Museum plaque of the Negro leagues star Leon Day, elected in 1995, depicts him wearing an Aguadilla Sharks cap. It is the only case in which a plaque features a cap from a league different from the National League, the American League or the Negro leagues. 

Liga de Béisbol Profesional Roberto Clemente
Professional baseball teams in Puerto Rico
Sports in Mayagüez, Puerto Rico